The A214 is a part primary, part non-primary A road in London, England.  It runs from Wandsworth to West Wickham.

London Ringways
The section at Wandsworth, which is part of Trinity Road, was to be part of the London Ringways and is built as a three lane dual carriageway between Wandsworth Roundabout and Dorlcote Road.

Route
The route runs through the London Borough of Wandsworth, London Borough of Lambeth, Lomdon Borough of Croydon and London Borough of Bromley, passing through Tooting Bec, Streatham, West Norwood, Crystal Palace, Anerley, Elmers End and Eden Park.

External links
SABRE Roads by Ten – A214

Roads in England
Streets in the London Borough of Bromley
Streets in the London Borough of Croydon
Streets in the London Borough of Lambeth
Streets in the London Borough of Southwark
Streets in the London Borough of Wandsworth